Sällström is a surname. Notable people with the surname include: 

Hugo Sällström (1870–1951), Swedish sailor 
Johanna Sällström (1974–2007), Swedish actress
Linda Sällström (born 1988), Finnish footballer
Per Sällström (1802–1839), Swedish opera tenor